Arash Karimi ( born 1977) is an Iranian photographer known for his documentary photos.

Biography 
He began his work in 1995 and has since held some exhibitions in different cities of Iran. Karimi won the Photographic Society of America Gold Medal at the New Photo Vision, an international contest of photography in Serbia.

References

External links
Official Website

Iranian photographers
1977 births
Living people
Documentary photographers
Place of birth missing (living people)